This is a list of notable Armenian Americans, including both original immigrants who obtained American citizenship and their American descendants. Armenian Americans are people born or raised in the United States, or who reside there, with origins in the country known as Armenia, which ranges from the Caucasian mountain range to the Armenian plateau. 

There has been sporadic emigration from Armenia to the U.S. since the late 19th century, with the biggest influx coming after the Armenian genocide of the early 20th century. The largest community in the United States is based in Los Angeles; however, other sizable communities exist in Boston, Detroit and the New York metropolitan area. Statistics from the United States 2000 Census, there are 385,488 Americans indicated either full or partial Armenian ancestry.

Academia

Activism

Actors, models, entertainers

Art, design

Architects

Banking and finance

Business

Families

Filmmakers and animators

Journalism

Law

Military

Music

Politicians

Religion

Sciences

Sports

Writers, literature, playwrights

See also
Armenian diaspora
Little Armenia, Los Angeles
Armenian Assembly of America
Armenian American Political Action Committee
Armenian National Committee of America
Armenian Youth Federation
List of Armenians
List of Armenian-Iranians
List of French Armenians
List of Canadian-Armenians
List of Russian-Armenians

References

External links

 

Lists of American people by ethnic or national origin
Americans
Armenian